Charles Dudley Warner (September 12, 1829 – October 20, 1900) was an American essayist, novelist, and friend of Mark Twain, with whom he co-authored the novel The Gilded Age: A Tale of Today.

Biography
Warner was born of Puritan descent in Plainfield, Massachusetts. From the ages of six to fourteen he lived in Charlemont, Massachusetts, the place and time revisited in his book Being a Boy (1877). He then moved to Cazenovia, New York, and in 1851 graduated from Hamilton College in Clinton, New York.

He worked with a surveying party in Missouri and then studied law at the University of Pennsylvania. He moved to Chicago, where he practiced law from 1856 to 1860, when he relocated to Connecticut to become assistant editor of The Hartford Press. By 1861 he had become editor, a position he held until 1867, when the paper merged into The Hartford Courant and he became co-editor with Joseph R. Hawley.

In 1884, he joined the editorial staff of Harper's Magazine, for which he conducted The Editor's Drawer until 1892, when he took charge of The Editor's Study.

Warner traveled widely, lectured frequently, and was actively interested in prison reform, city park supervision, and other movements for the public good. He was the first president of the National Institute of Arts and Letters, and, at the time of his death, was president of the American Social Science Association.

He first attracted attention with the reflective sketches in My Summer in a Garden (1870). First published as a series in The Hartford Courant, these sketches were popular for their abounding and refined humor and mellow personal charm, their love of the outdoors, their suggestive comment on life and affairs, and their delicately finished style, qualities that suggested the work of Washington Irving. In 1873, the work Warner is known for today, the novel he wrote with Mark Twain, was published. Called The Gilded Age: A Tale of Today, it gave that era of American history its name.

Charles Dudley Warner is known for making these famous remarks,
 
 Quoted by Mark Twain in one of his many humorous lectures, Warner's quip is still commonly misattributed to Twain.

He died in Hartford on October 20, 1900, and was interred at Cedar Hill Cemetery, with Mark Twain as a pall bearer and Joseph Twichell officiating.

The citizens of San Diego so appreciated Warner's flattering description of their city in his book Our Italy that they named three consecutive streets in the Point Loma neighborhood after him: Charles Street, Dudley Street, and Warner Street.

Selected works
 My Summer in a Garden and Calvin [his cat], A Study of Character (Boston: James R. Osgood & Co., 1870)
 Saunterings (1872), descriptions of travel in Western Europe
 BackLog Studies (1872)
 Baddeck, And That Sort of Thing (1874), travels in Nova Scotia and elsewhere
 My Winter on the Nile (1876)
 In the Levant (1876)
 In the Wilderness (1878)
 A Roundabout Journey, in Europe (1883)
 On Horseback, in the Southern States (1888)
 Studies in the South and West, with Comments on Canada (1889)
 Our Italy, etc. [A description of Southern California.] (1891)
 The Relation of Literature to Life (1896)
 The People for Whom Shakespeare Wrote (1897)
 Fashions in Literature (1902)

He edited The American Men of Letters series, to which he contributed a biography of Washington Irving (1881), and also edited a large Library of the World's Best Literature (1897). At the time of his death, Warner was writing a biography of his friend Frederic Edwin Church.

Essays
A-Hunting of the Deer (1875)
As We Were Saying (1891)
 As We Go (1893)

Novels
 The Gilded Age: A Tale of Today (in collaboration with Mark Twain, 1873)
 Their Pilgrimage (1886)
 A Little Journey in the World (1889)
 The Golden House (1894)
 That Fortune (1899).

Further reading
 Andrews, Kenneth R. (1950). Nook Farm: Mark Twain's Hartford Circle. Harvard University Press. Has a lot on Warner, including a complete bibliography of his works.
 Fields, Annie A. (1904). Charles Dudley Warner. New York: McClure, Phillips & Co.
 Lounsbury, T.R. (1904). "Biographical Sketch." In: The Complete Writings of Charles Dudley Warner, Vol. XV. Hartford, Conn: American Publishing Co., pp. i–xxxviii.
 Matthews, Brander (1902). "Mr. Charles Dudley Warner as a Writer of Fiction." In: Aspects of Fiction. New York: Charles Scribner's Sons, pp. 280–297.
 Paine, A.B. (1912). Mark Twain: A Biography. New York: Harper & Brothers.

References 

Attribution:

External links

 Finding aid to Charles Dudley Warner letters at Columbia University. Rare Book & Manuscript Library.
 Charles Dudley Warner page with brief biographical sketch and links to his works available on the web, including his "Editor's Study" columns.
 CHARLES DUDLEY WARNER by Mrs. James T. Fields.  New York: McClure, Phillips, & Co., 1904. Contemporary Men of Letters Series.
 
 
 
 Calvin the Cat, A Study of Character

1829 births
1900 deaths
19th-century American novelists
American male essayists
American male novelists
American people of English descent
Art Students League of New York faculty
Burials at Cedar Hill Cemetery (Hartford, Connecticut)
Hamilton College (New York) alumni
Novelists from Massachusetts
Novelists from New York (state)
People from Cazenovia, New York
People from Charlemont, Massachusetts
People from Plainfield, Massachusetts
Writers from Hartford, Connecticut